Ford Administration Building is a historic school located at Peekskill, Westchester County, New York. It was built in 1925 and is a two-story, "I"-shaped, red brick building in the Colonial Revival style. It features a central portico with four Doric order columns.  The slate covered hipped roof is topped by a cupola. It houses the 500-seat Ford Auditorium.  It was built for the Peekskill Military Academy (1833–1968) and is the last significant structure remaining from the academy.

It was added to the National Register of Historic Places in 2006.

References

School buildings on the National Register of Historic Places in New York (state)
Colonial Revival architecture in New York (state)
School buildings completed in 1925
Schools in Westchester County, New York
Buildings and structures in Peekskill, New York
National Register of Historic Places in Westchester County, New York
1925 establishments in New York (state)